Haft Khaneh (also Romanized as Haft Khāneh; also known as Haft Khānī) is a village in Khezel-e Gharbi Rural District, in the Central District of Kangavar County, Kermanshah Province, Iran. At the 2006 census, its population was 19, in 4 families.

References 

Populated places in Kangavar County